Canadian Grand Prix can refer to:

Canadian Grand Prix, a Formula One motor race
Canadian motorcycle Grand Prix
 ISU Junior Grand Prix in Canada, for junior figure skating
 Skate Canada International, a senior figure skating international grand prix

See also
 Grand Prix of Mosport
 Grand Prix of Montreal
 Mont-Tremblant Champ Car Grand Prix
Motorsport in Canada